Caprezzo is a comune (municipality) in the Province of Verbano-Cusio-Ossola in the Italian region Piedmont, located about  northeast of Turin and about  northeast of Verbania.

The municipality of Caprezzo contains the frazione (subdivision) Ponte Nivia.

Caprezzo borders the following municipalities: Cambiasca, Intragna, Miazzina, Vignone.

It is the birthplace of Baldassare Verazzi.

Demographic evolution

References

Cities and towns in Piedmont